The Wounded Angel (Jaraly perishte) is a 2016 Kazakhstani drama film directed by Emir Baigazin. It was shown in the Panorama section at the 66th Berlin International Film Festival.

Cast
 Nurlybek Saktaganov
 Madiyar Aripbay
 Madiyar Nazarov
 Omar Adilov
 Anzara Barlykova

References

External links
 

2016 films
2016 drama films
Kazakh-language films
Films directed by Emir Baigazin
Kazakhstani drama films